The Supercopa do Brasil is a Brazilian association football trophy organized by the Brazilian Football Confederation (CBF). It is contested between the champions of the Campeonato Brasileiro and the winners of the Copa do Brasil. If the same club wins Campeonato Brasileiro and Copa do Brasil, their opponent will be the Campeonato Brasileiro runner-up.

The Brazilian Football Confederation (CBF) announced in 2013 a new edition of the competition was expected to be played in 2015. The revival would only take place in 2020.

Results

List of champions

Unofficial competition 
An unofficial competition was played in 1992, between the champions of the Série A and of the Série B, as both championships were played in the first six months of the year. The game was played on 12 August between Flamengo (champion of the Série A) and Paraná (champion of the Série B). The game ended in a 2–2 draw, and in the penalty shootout, Flamengo beat the opponent 4–3. While RSSSF  regards the competition as some form of Supercopa do Brasil, although officially not regards as Supercopa do Brasil, in Brazil the competition was popularly known as Taça Brahma dos Campeões. Differently from the 1990 and 1991 editions, which were official CBF competitions, the 1992 edition was a friendly cup.

Friendlies 
In 2018, Corinthians, champion of 2017 Campeonato Brasileiro Série A and Cruzeiro, champion of 2017 Copa do Brasil, played two friendly matches during the period corresponding to the 2018 FIFA World Cup. The first game, played at Mineirão on July 4 ended with a 2–0 win for Corinthians, while the return game, played on July 11 at the Arena Corinthians, ended in a 2–2 draw.

References

 
Football cup competitions in Brazil
Copa do Brasil
Campeonato Brasileiro Série A
Brazil